The Kanev uezd was one of the subdivisions of the Kiev Governorate of the Russian Empire. It was situated in the eastern part of the governorate. Its administrative centre was Kanev (Kaniv).

Demographics
At the time of the Russian Empire Census of 1897, Kanevsky Uyezd had a population of 268,860. Of these, 88.7% spoke Ukrainian, 9.7% Yiddish, 1.0% Russian and 0.5% Polish as their native language.

References

 
Uezds of Kiev Governorate
1837 establishments in the Russian Empire
1923 disestablishments in Ukraine